Phyllonorycter arbutusella is a moth of the family Gracillariidae. It is known from California, United States.

The wingspan is about 8 mm.

The larvae feed on Arbutus menziesii. They mine the leaves of their host plant.

References

arbutusella
Moths of North America

Moths described in 1908
Taxa named by Annette Frances Braun
Leaf miners
Lepidoptera of the United States